Religious revival may refer to:

 Christian revival
 Revival meeting
 Islamic revival

See also
 Revival (disambiguation)